Bering Sea Gold (also known as Gold Divers in the UK) is a reality television series set in Nome, Alaska, on Norton Sound, that airs on Discovery Channel. It is from the creators of the Deadliest Catch reality TV show.

The show is divided into the summer dredging season (aired in the spring), under the title Bering Sea Gold, and the spring dredging season (aired in the fall), under the title Bering Sea Gold: Under The Ice. For the first three seasons, this distinction held; in the 2015 4th season of the spring ice dredging season, the title card changed to "Bering Sea Gold", making the title identical to the original summer dredging season show. This continued with the 2016 5th seasons.

The show follows boats equipped with various setups to achieve gold mining in a summertime, cold northern latitude, shallow water, ocean environment. The fleet each typically consists of a sluicing apparatus, a means of paydirt collection (dredge), and a cold-water-diving life support system. Conflict issues include choppy seas, poor underwater visibility, inconsistent fuel delivery, personnel issues, mining location rights, sufficient paydirt discovery, diver safety, and ocean-damaged equipment failures. Each season of episodes follow the current fleet of dredges.

The "ice" series follows dredges housed in temporary shelters set up over ice holes. Several crew members have appeared in both the summer dredging and spring ice dredging seasons.

History

In 2012, one of the featured divers on the show, John Bunce, committed suicide during the course of filming the season. The incident aired in 2013.

On March 11, 2020, it was announced that the fourteenth season will premiere on April 1, 2020.

The Martinson mining family, shown as background characters on Bering Sea Gold, was featured in Gold Rush: Freddy Dodge's Mine Rescue.

Cast

Season 1

Season 1 ICE

Season 2

Season 2 ICE

Season 3

Season 3 ICE

Season 4

Season 4 ICE

Dredges

Under The Ice dredges

Episodes

Gold totals

Season 1

Season 1 ICE

Season 2

Season 2 ICE

Season 3

Season 3 ICE

Season 4

Season 4 ICE

Syndication 
Season 1

 Discovery Channel Bering Sea Gold
 Discovery Channel Gold Divers
: Discovery Channel Morze złota
: DMAX Goldtaucher der Beringsee

Season 2

 Discovery Channel Bering Sea Gold
 Discovery Channel Gold Divers
: Discovery Channel Morze złota
: DMAX Goldtaucher der Beringsee

Legacy
With the popularity of the show, it has inspired many people to head to Nome, and suction dredge in Norton Bay. In 2015, over 100 gold dredges operated in the summer sea mining season, significantly more than before the TV show started.

See also 
 Gold mining in Alaska

References

External links 

Official Discovery Channel - Bering Sea Gold - web page
Bering Sea Gold: Under the Ice - web page
Discovery Channel Canada - Bering Sea Gold

 
2010s American reality television series
2012 American television series debuts
Discovery Channel original programming
Television shows set in Alaska
Television series by Original Productions